Wonderland Sound and Vision is an American production company founded by director and producer Joseph McGinty Nichol in 2001. It independently develops, produces and finances its own slate of feature films, television and digital projects. The company is responsible for television series The O.C., Chuck, and Supernatural, alongside films Terminator Salvation, We Are Marshall, The DUFF and The Babysitter.

History 
The company was originally formed after the success of Charlie's Angels, setting up Wonderland with a two-year motion picture deal at Columbia Pictures to set up projects on November 3, 2000. Wonderland set up its own television shop on October 8, 2001, with its first gig, Fastlane, with John McNamara, whose by that time, received an exclusive production pact with Warner Bros. Television themselves.

On July 16, 2002, the company received a two-year production contract at Warner Bros. Television to produce their television projects. On September 9, 2004, former Fox drama topper Peter Johnson joined Wonderland Sound and Vision as television president of the studio.

On August 2, 2007, the company signed a first look deal with Warner Bros., whose television contract was already renewed, to develop film projects for the studio.

Filmography

Television

Film

Internet television

References

External links 
 

Television production companies of the United States